Sevā (also transcribed as sewa), in Hinduism and Sikhism, is the concept of selfless service that is performed without any expectation of result or award for performing it. Such services can be performed to benefit other human beings or society. Seva means "service". A more recent interpretation of the word is "dedication to others". In Hinduism, it is also known as karma yoga, as described in the Bhagavata Gita.

Etymology and religious significance
Seva comes from the Sanskrit root sev-, "to serve", and is a central concept in both contemporary Hinduism and Sikhism.

In Hinduism, seva means selfless service and is often associated with karma yoga, disciplined action, and bhakti yoga, disciplined devotion. Seva is also connected to other Sanskrit concepts such as dāna (gift giving), karunā (compassion), and preman (kindness). Seva is also performed as a form of ego-transcending spiritual practise known as Sadhana, and plays a large role in modern Hinduism. This is because a key concept in Hinduism is liberation (Moksha) from the cycle of births and deaths (Saṃsāra), and sadhana is the effort one makes to strive for liberation, highlighting the importance of service to others.

In Sikhism, the word seva also means "to worship, to adore, to pay homage through the act of love." In the writings of Sikh gurus, these two meanings of seva (service and worship) have been merged. Seva is expected to be a labour of love performed without desire and intention, and with humility.

Kar seva, a concept of Sikhism, is often translated as "voluntary labour". A volunteer for kar seva is called a kar sevak (voluntary labourer). A kar sevak is someone who freely offers their services to a religious cause. Sikhs use the term kar sevak to represent people who engage in ministrations, altruistic philanthropy, and humanitarian endeavours in service to religion and society. Sevadar (also transcribed as sewadar), literally "seva-supporter", is another Punjabi word for a volunteer who performs seva.

The idea of selfless service (seva) is an important concept in several religions because God is perceived as having an interest in the well-being of others as well as oneself; serving other people is considered an essential devotional practise of indirectly serving God and living a religious life that is a benefit to others. People of every religion are included in this service.

Seva in Hinduism

In Hinduism, seva is the concept of service to God and/or humanity, without the expectation of return. According to Hindu scriptures, seva is seen as the highest form of dharma (righteousness). Seva has been said to provide good karma which facilitates the atma (soul) to obtain moksha (emancipation from the cycle of death and rebirth). Before the early nineteenth century, the meaning of seva (serving or honouring) had been virtually synonymous with that of puja (worship), which typically also included distribution of prasad (sacrificial offerings or consecrated food), such as food, fruits, and sweets to all gathered. Thus, seva typically involved offering of food to a deity and its murti (idol), followed by the distribution of said food as prasad. The concept of seva and karma yoga is explained in the Bhagavad Gita, where Krishna expounds on the subject. In modern times, the concept has been taken to volunteering for the greater good, such as in disaster relief and other major incidents.

Seva in Sikhism

Kar seva, (Gurmukhi: ਕਾਰ ਸੇਵਾ) from the Sanskrit words kar, meaning hands or work, and seva, meaning service, is one of the main teachings of Sikhism — including its ordained philosophy, in Sikh scripture, theology, and hermeneutics. A tradition set forth with the clear understanding that there is God within all of us, and thus by serving humanity you are serving God's creation. Furthermore, there is also a belief that seva is a way to control inner vices and is a key process in becoming closer to God.

Seva in Sikhism takes three forms: tan (Gurmukhi: ਤਨ), meaning physical service, i.e. manual labour, man (Gurmukhi: ਮਨ), meaning mental service, such as studying to help others, and dhan (Gurmukhi: ਧਨ), meaning material service, including financial support. Sikhism stresses kirat karō (Gurmukhi: ਕਿਰਤ ਕਰੋ), "honest work", and vaṇḍ chakkō (Gurmukhi: ਵੰਡ ਛਕੋ), "split up", sharing what you have by giving to the needy for the benefit of the community. It is a duty of every Sikh to engage in seva wherever possible, such as volunteering at a Gurdwara, community center, senior living centers, care centers, sites of major world disasters, etc. Seva is also performed further by offering service for a religious cause, often for constructing a gurdwara, a place of worship serving the One Creator which performs community services such as liturgy and providing communal food kitchens open to all communities and religions, regardless of those who attended the service or not, where the volunteers prepare and serve meals.

Criticism 

Some Kar Seva groups and organizations have been criticized for their lack of care for and apathy towards preserving historical Sikh heritage sites, artwork, and architecture during renovation and construction projects. Large amounts of historical Sikh scriptural manuscripts have been systematically "cremated" (burnt to destruction) over the years at secretive ‘Angitha Sahib’ gurdwaras in Punjab and around India under the guise of kar seva. This practice is criticized for systematically destroying historical manuscripts rendering them unable to be researched, archived, repaired, or conserved for future generations.

See also
 Community Service general concepts:
 Bhandara (community kitchen)
 Dakshina  
 Punya (Hinduism)

References

Sikh practices
Sikh philosophy
Sikh terminology
Sanskrit words and phrases
Hindu practices
Vishva Hindu Parishad
October observances
International observances
Volunteering in India
Alms
Telugu words and phrases
Alms in Hinduism